Old Ties is an album by American musician Norman Blake, released in 2002.

Track listing 
 "Spanish Fandango" (Traditional) – 3:49
 "Church St. Blues" (Norman Blake) – 2:54
 "Sleepy Eyed Joe/Indian Creek" (Traditional) – 3:38
 "O'Malley's Tune" (Traditional) – 2:30
 "Fifty Miles of Elbow Room" (A. P. Carter) – 3:49
 "Down Home Summertime Blues" (Blake) – 3:42
 "Blind Dog" (Blake) – 2:55
 "Fiddler's Dram/Whiskey Before Breakfast" (Traditional) – 3:35
 "Old Ties" (Uncle Dave Macon) – 4:26
 "Lost Indian" (Traditional) – 3:08
 "Ginseng Sullivan" (Traditional) – 3:31
 "Obc, No. 3" (Blake) – 5:48
 "Prettiest Little Girl in the Country" (Traditional) – 2:17
 "Uncle" (Blake) – 4:34
 "Bristol in the Bottle" (Blake) – 2:05
 "Billy Gray" (Blake) – 4:07
 "The Fields of November" (Blake) – 4:06
 "Gonna Lay Down My Old Guitar" (Alton Delmore, Rabon Delmore) – 3:34
 "Randall Collins/Done Gone" (Blake) – 6:06

Personnel
Norman Blake – guitar, fiddle, vocals
Nancy Blake – guitar, cello
Tony Rice – guitar, vocals
Doc Watson – guitar
James Bryan – fiddle
Charlie Collins – fiddle, guitar
Ben Pedigoe – banjo

References

Norman Blake (American musician) albums
2002 compilation albums